Zombiesthaan (Land of Zombie) is a Bengali horror zombie film directed by Abhirup Ghosh and produced by Rajesh Kumar Pandey. This is the first Bengali language zombie film and a dystopian adventure movie that is set in a post-apocalyptic Bengal. The film was released in theaters on 13 December 2019 under the banner of Krishna Motion Pictures.

Plot
The movie revolves around the post apocalyptic adventure of one lady and her struggle for survival. In the year 2030, a deadly biochemical weapon has spread across the world, and turns the major people into ferocious zombies. A survivor, Akira is traveling through the wastelands of Bengal and trying to find out her way into a military safe zone. All communication systems are out of order. In her journey, she faces insane zombies. Akira takes shelter in the house of one mysterious Anil Chatterjee at Rupnarayanpur. Anil believes that the human era is over and there is no safe zone at all. He asks Akira to stay there. The very next day Akira founds that Anil became cannibalistic, she flees from Rupnarayanpur. She receives a transmitter message that an army safe zone is active 400 km away. But a megalomaniac and pervert King Raja Haridas captures Akira. Now she has to fight against the King.

Cast
 Rudranil Ghosh as Anil
 Tanusree Chakraborty as Akira
 Rajatava Dutta as Raja Haridas
 Souman Bose as Military officer
 Jeena Tarafder as Karuna
 Debolina Biswas
 Sourav Saha 
 Satyahari Mondal

References

External links
 

2019 films
Bengali-language Indian films
2010s Bengali-language films
Indian action horror films
Indian post-apocalyptic films
2010s action horror films